is a conglomerate based in Tokorozawa, Saitama, Japan, with principal business areas in railways, tourism, and real estate. Seibu Railway's operations are concentrated in northwest Tokyo and Saitama Prefecture; the name "Seibu" is an abbreviation of "west Musashi", referring to the historic name for this area. It and its holding company hold shares of numerous bus, hotel and tourism operations nationwide.

History 
"Seibu Railway" was originally the name of a tram service between Shinjuku and Ogikubo, which was transferred to the Tokyo metropolitan government in 1951 and eventually closed in 1962. The Seibu Railway was acquired in 1921 by the Kawagoe Railway, which had operated a train service between Kokubunji and Kawagoe since 1894; the merged company kept the "Seibu" name and expanded its main line to Takadanobaba, forming what is now known as the Seibu Shinjuku Line.

The current Seibu Railway is a product of a 1945 merger between the former Seibu Railway and the Musashino Railway, which was founded in 1912 to operate what is now known as the Seibu Ikebukuro Line. The merger was largely orchestrated by Yasujirō Tsutsumi, a real estate developer who opened the Tamako Railway (now the Seibu Tamako Line) in 1928, became a major shareholder in the Musashino Railway and merged the two in 1940.

In 1944, the Tokyo metropolitan government, under the administration of Shigeo Ōdachi, hired the Seibu Railway and the Musashino Railway to provide a coordinated service to transport night soil from central Tokyo to outlying disposal areas. At the time, night soil was generally transported by truck to Tokyo Bay and disposed of by dumping there, but the progress of World War II led to gasoline and personnel shortages which made this system unsustainable. The sewage service continued through the American occupation until 1951. As a result of this service cooperation, Seibu Railway merged with Musashino Railway to form the current Seibu Railway, effective in September 1945. Tokyu Group president Keita Goto had an intense personal rivalry with Tsutsumi, and unsuccessfully attempted to block both Tsutsumi's takeover of the Musashino Railway and its merger with the Seibu Railway.

The former Seibu network based around Shinjuku and the former Musashino network based around Ikebukuro remain operationally separated today. In 1986, Seibu Railway moved its headquarters from the Ikebukuro area to Tokorozawa, Saitama, where the two main Seibu lines intersect.

Tsutsumi became the controlling shareholder in Seibu Railway following the merger through his holding company Kokudo Corporation. After gaining control of Seibu, Kokudo developed the Prince Hotels chain, acquired the baseball team now known as the Saitama Seibu Lions, in addition to continuing its core real estate business throughout the Tokyo area. Seibu Railway had its initial public offering on the Tokyo Stock Exchange in 1949 but remained under the control of Tsutsumi through Kokudo.

Station numbering was introduced on all Seibu Railway lines during fiscal 2012.

Delisting and takeover struggle
Tsutsumi registered Seibu Railway shares owned by Kokudo in the names of various affiliated individuals, often without their permission, so that the true ownership of the company was not readily apparent. Following the death of Tsutsumi in 1964, his third son Yoshiaki Tsutsumi inherited control of Kokudo and continued the practice of falsifying shareholder records. His holdings in Kokudo and Seibu led to his being deemed the "world's richest man" by Forbes magazine for four consecutive years from 1987 to 1990, with estimated net worth of $15–20 billion during the height of the Japanese asset bubble. He was arrested on securities fraud charges in March 2005.

On December 21, 2005, Seibu Railway was delisted from the Tokyo Stock Exchange. A reorganization of the group, completed in February 2006, created Seibu Holdings to act as a holding company for both the railway and Prince Hotels. Cerberus Capital Management, an American investment fund, became the largest shareholder in Seibu Holdings with a 29.9% share of the new company.

In late 2012 and early 2013, Cerberus proposed that Seibu Railway abolish five non-core lines, along with other restructuring measures throughout the Seibu Holdings group, but management refused to implement these changes. Cerberus then executed a tender offer to increase its stake to 35% as of June 2013, giving Cerberus the power to veto shareholder resolutions. Cerberus had aimed to raise its stake to 44%, bringing it closer to an outright majority, but Seibu management engaged in a massive campaign to thwart the tender offer, including advertising within Seibu trains to passengers who owned stock. The East Japan Railway Company and several financial institutions also planned a support scheme to keep Cerberus from acquiring control of Seibu, but it was ultimately not implemented due to a lack of potential financial benefit for the investors. At the June 2013 shareholder meeting, several proposals by Cerberus were voted down, including the election of outside directors and the abolition of non-core lines.

, Yoshiaki Tsutsumi remains a major investor in Seibu Holdings through his 36% investment in NW Corporation, the second-largest shareholder in the company with a share of around 15%. Tsutsumi refused to respond to the Cerberus tender offer at the urging of Seibu management.

Railway operations

As of June 2017, Seibu's routes total . They fall into two separate groups. Tokorozawa Station is the crossing point of Ikebukuro Line and Shinjuku Line.

Seibu Railway is well known for its bright yellow colored trains. However, more recent trains have a blue colored line on unpainted stainless steel or aluminium bodies.

Ikebukuro Line Group
The Ikebukuro Line group includes the Ikebukuro Line and its branches.
 Ikebukuro Line: Ikebukuro Station—Tokorozawa Station—Hannō Station—Agano Station
offers direct through service via the Seibu Yūrakuchō Line to: Shin-Kiba Station on the Tokyo Metro Yūrakuchō Line and Motomachi-Chūkagai Station on the Minatomirai Line via the Tōkyū Tōyoko Line and the Tokyo Metro Fukutoshin Line.
 Seibu Chichibu Line: Agano Station—Seibu Chichibu Station
 Seibu Yūrakuchō Line: Nerima Station—Kotake-mukaihara Station
connects the Ikebukuro Line and the Tokyo Metro system
 Toshima Line: Nerima Station—Toshimaen Station
 Sayama Line: Nishi-Tokorozawa Station—Seibukyūjō-mae Station

Shinjuku Line Group 
The Shinjuku Line group includes the Shinjuku Line and its branches, as well as the Tamagawa Line, which is not a branch of the Shinjuku Line but had been owned by the Shinjuku Line's operator before its merger with the Ikebukuro Line operator.
 Shinjuku Line: Seibu Shinjuku Station–Tokorozawa Station–Hon-Kawagoe Station
 Seibuen Line: Higashi-Murayama Station—Seibuen Station
 Haijima Line: Kodaira Station—Haijima Station
 Tamako Line: Kokubunji Station—Hagiyama Station—Tamako Station
 Kokubunji Line: Higashi-Murayama Station—Ogawa Station—Kokubunji Station
 Tamagawa Line: Musashi-Sakai Station—Koremasa Station

Prior to the formal closure, the  freight line between Minami-Ōtsuka Station and Ahina Station had suspended operation since 1963.

People mover
 Yamaguchi Line: Tamako Station—Seibukyūjō-mae Station

Rolling stock
, Seibu operates a fleet of 1,274 electric multiple unit (EMU) vehicles.
 Seibu 101 series (since 1969)
 Seibu 2000 series (since 1977)
 Seibu 4000 series (since 1988)
 Seibu 6000 series (since 1992)
 Seibu 9000 series (since 1993)
 Seibu 10000 series (since 1993)
 Seibu 20000 series (since 2000)
 Seibu 30000 series (since 2008)
 Seibu 40000 series (since March 2017)
 Seibu 001 series (since 2019)

Future rolling stock
A new fleet of seven eight-car Seibu 001 series limited express trains (56 vehicles in total) is scheduled to be introduced during fiscal 2018 and 2019. The new trains are to be built by Hitachi, with the design and styling overseen by architect Kazuyo Sejima.

Former rolling stock
 Seibu 3000 series (1982-2014)

Fares
Single fare (Adult)

Affiliated companies
 Prince Hotels
 Seibu Construction
 Seibu Bus
 Saitama Seibu Lions (professional baseball team)
 Seibu Dome
 Seibu Real Estate
 Seibu Trading

References 

  The Japan Times (December 22, 2005), Seibu Railway shareholders OK reorganizing plan. Retrieved December 22, 2005.

External links

 Seibu Railway website 
 Seibu Railway website

 
Companies based in Saitama Prefecture
Greater Tokyo Area
Rail transport in Saitama Prefecture
Rail transport in Tokyo
Railway companies of Japan
Companies formerly listed on the Tokyo Stock Exchange